The Dean of Cloyne is based at the Cathedral Church of St Coleman in Cloyne in the Diocese of Cloyne within the united bishopric of Cork, Cloyne and Ross.

The incumbent is Rev. Susan Green.

List of deans of Cloyne (Church of Ireland)

1591 John Fitzedmund
1612/3–1614 Thomas Winter 
1615–?1639 Edward Clerke 
1640–1660 Michael Boyle (afterwards Bishop of Cork, Cloyne and Ross, 1660) 
1660/1–1671 Henry Rugg 
1671–1691 William Fitzgerald (afterwards Bishop of Clonfert and Kilmacduagh, 1691) 
1691–1703/4 Henry Scardeville
1703/4 Thomas Deane 
1714–1714 Robert Sesse 
1714 Thomas Simcocks 
1718–1720 Josiah Hort (afterwards Dean of Ardagh, 1720) 
1720–1726 Henry Maule (afterwards Bishop of Cloyne, 1726) 
1726–1736 James Ward 
1736–1769 Isaac Goldsmith 
1769–1770 William Pratt 
1770–1779 Eyton Butts 
1779–1804 Hon John Hewitt, younger son of James Hewitt, 1st Viscount Lifford
1804–1815 James Hamilton (astronomer) 
1816–1823 Alexander Arbuthnot (afterwards Bishop of Killaloe and Kilfenora, 1823) 
1823–1845 Thomas John Burgh
1845–1850 Hervey de Montmorency, 4th Viscount Mountmorres (afterwards Dean of Achonry, 1851) 
1851–1884 James Howie
1884–1909 Horace Fleming
1909–1934 William Wilson
1934–1952 Hugh Berry
1952–1957 Joseph Warner (afterwards Archdeacon of Cloyne, 1957)
1957–1973 Phineas Bury
1973–1984 John Ridley-Barker
1985–2002 George Hilliard
2003–2017 Alan Marley
2018–present Susan Green

References

 
Diocese of Cork, Cloyne and Ross
Cloyne